is a Japanese football player for Vonds Ichihara.

Career
Noda was born in Tokyo on April 2, 1998. Noda was picked among youngsters to be promoted to the top team of Vissel Kobe in 2017. He was then loaned to FC Imabari before returning to Kobe.

Club statistics
Updated to 22 August 2018.

References

External links

Profile at J. League
Profile at Vissel Kobe

1998 births
Living people
Association football people from Hyōgo Prefecture
Japanese footballers
J1 League players
Japan Football League players
Vissel Kobe players
FC Imabari players
Kataller Toyama players
Vonds Ichihara players
Association football midfielders